Ashton Park School is a coeducational secondary school and sixth form located in the Bower Ashton area of Bristol, England.

History
The school opened on 8 September 1955 as Ashton Park Secondary Modern School, built in the grounds of Ashton Court.

Students come from primary schools including Ashton Gate, Hotwells, Southville, Compass Point, Hillcrest Primary School and Luckwell.
The school has a sixth form centre which has the freedom of college, but the support of a school. This prepares students for the next stage in their life. The school was a specialist Sports College. The school still has many extra curriculum clubs for a wide variety of team sports, dance and athletics.

Previously a foundation school administered by Bristol City Council, in July 2018 Ashton Park School converted to academy status. The school is now sponsored by the Gatehouse Green Learning Trust.

Building
The 1950s teaching accommodation was demolished in 2009/2010 and replaced by a new 39 classroom teaching block which opened in September 2010. It is fitted with toilets on every floor (but not in the outlying blocks), CCTV, a recording studio for music students and specialist art classrooms and science labs. There is also a new canteen as well as the old one with a finger print reading  system, so no money is exchanged at the counter.

Academic achievement
The table below shows the shows the schools Progress 8 score.

Ashton Park Sixth Form
The Sixth Form Centre is located just behind Ashton Park Secondary School its main intake are students from Ashton Park School, Bedminster Down, Oasis Academy Brightstowe, Bridge Learning Campus and Merchants' Academy.

They offer a range of A Levels, Vocational A Levels, BTEC First Diplomas and NVQ Courses, as well as GCSE Mathematics and English retakes.

Notable former pupils
 Andy Parfitt, Former controller of BBC Radio 1
 Gareth Chilcott, rugby union player
 Lloyd James, footballer
 Yann Thomas, rugby union player

References

External links
 

Secondary schools in Bristol
Academies in Bristol
Educational institutions established in 1955
1955 establishments in England